Pollangu is a 2012 Indian Tamil-language adventure thriller film directed by Gandhi Marx and starring Ravi Rahul and Nisha Lalwani.

Cast 
 Ravi Rahul as Rahul
Nisha Lalwani as Jhansi 
 Vishwa
Vetri
Yatra 
Narayanan

Production
This film marks the directorial debut of Gandhi Marx, who previously directed two short films and a documentary film. Although the film is an adventure thriller, the director decided to insert songs in the film for the commercial aspect. Hindi actress Nisha Lalwani, who previously starred in Kalyug (2005), was cast as a lead in this heroine-centric thriller and worked on this film at the same time as Sabki Bajegi Band (2015). Actor Ravi Rahul made a comeback in leading role after two decades. The film was shot in the deep forests of Chalakudy, Kodaikanal, and Talakona.

Soundtrack
Music was composed by Jubin in his third film album after Vinmeengal (2012) and Pazhaya Vannarapettai (2016).
"Maanattam" - Malathi, Rahul Nambiar, MLR Karthikeyan; lyrics by Snehan
"Puli Varuthu" -  Roshini, MLR Karthikeyan
"Onna Renda" - Priya Himesh
"Kadhaley Un" - Harini, Naresh Iyer; lyrics by Yugabharathi
"Kadhaley Un" (remix)

Release and reception
The film released on 27 July alongside Maalai Pozhudhin Mayakathilaey and Suzhal.

A critic from The Times of India opined that "The screenplay moves in such a way that nothing is revealed to the audience at necessary intervals, and it tests our patience". Malini Mannath of The New Indian Express wrote that "the director can be appreciated for going off the beaten path and from formula-plots. But a more coherent screenplay and a focused narration could have made the film a riveting thriller". A critic from Sify said that "It's not often one gets to see a jungle thriller and once in a way when one comes along, there are always expectations that hopefully it may showcase something different and offbeat. But Pollangu disappoints". A critic from Behindwoods stated that "It looks as if the director has created a random scenario for a movie so that he could showcase the lovely locations he has enjoyed watching".

Box office 
The film was recorded as "below average" at the Chennai box office.

References

External links